Búrfell and the connected lava channel Búrfellsgjá  are famous landmarks of the Reykjanes peninsula, Southwest Iceland. They are part of the Krýsuvík volcanic system.

Name
The name Búrfell is widespread in Iceland.  It means "pantry mountain."

Pyroclastic cone Búrfell
The spatter cone Búrfell is located at about 7 km from Hafnarfjörður in Heiðmörk, part of the Krýsuvík volcanic system. and its northernmost outpost as a volcano. The volcanic cones sits on older lava layers, the Tertiary Grey Basalt lavas which are the basement rocks of the area of Heiðmörk.

It originated in an eruption series from the same source. When these eruptions took place is still discussed, M. Traustadóttir proposes a date about 7300 years ago, other scientists argue that it was over 8000 years ago

The Búrfell cone has a near-circular form "with ramparts made up almost entirely of spatter ejected by lava fountains". The 80 m high crater rims enclose a 60 m and 140 m wide crater. During the eruption, it contained a lava lake.

Búrfell is an exception in the volcanic landscape of the Reykjanes peninsula in Southwest Iceland, as it is not part of a cone row, but an isolated monogenetic cone, which nevertheless produced a long drawn-out eruption series and a rather big lava field reaching down to the sea at many places and under many names, between Hafnarfjörður and Straumsvík as well as in Álftanes into Skerjafjörður.

Lava field Búrfellshraun
The lava field Búrfellshraun  measures in the whole 18 km2 and is thought to have a volume of about 0,36 km3 as well as a length of about 12 km, one of the bigger lava fields on the Reykjanes peninsula. The lavas are today partially covered up by structures and another part of them lies under seawater in the fjords Skerjafjörður and Hafnarfjörður, as the sea water level at time of eruptions was lower than it is today.

Whereas the geologic denomination is Búrfellshraun for all the lava of the eruption, the locals, depending on the region, use different names. The branches in direction of Skerjafjörður e.g. are called Urriðakotshraun , Vífilsstaðahraun  and Gálgahraun ("Gallow's lava").

Lava channels of Búrfellshraun
The lava channels (and lava tubes) built up the different episodes of the eruption.

Progression of the eruption and formation of lava channels
In the beginning the Kaldársel Branch of the lava run to the southwest, following at the same time a fault system in the region, the Hjallar Faults. At Kringlóttagjá a lava pond formed when the lava flow was stopped temporarily by topography. Till then, transport took place in open channels. The lava flows advanced then to Kaldársel—today there is a hut and well-known parking lot for hikers—and from there to the north, fed by Kringlóttagjá lava pond. There lava tubes formed.

Búrfellsgjá
The lava channel Búrfellsgjá which reaches 3,5 km from the crater in northwestern direction, is said to have built up, when there was a lava lake overflow. After some time, the lava production stopped suddenly and this is the reason why the lava channel is still so well preserved.

As the Krýsuvík system had undergone a number of earthquake series in the years before 2012, levelling measurements were carried out in Búrfellsgjá in this year and compared to others from the years before. The result was subsidence which could possibly be explained by extension movements of the fissure system.

Other lava channels
Another lava channel reaches west from Búrfell in direction of Kaldársel, but filled up with lava so it is not easily discovered. This is the oldest lava channel, it is named Lambagjá ("lamb canyon"), the youngest is Kringlóttagjá ("round canyon") south of Búrfellsgjá, where there was also a lava pond.

Lava tubes of Búrfellshraun
Both lava tubes are branches of Búrfellsgjá, in western direction, the second one being more interesting, because it shows some well preserved lava formations.

Hiking
Partially marked hiking trails lead from Route 408 into Búrfellsgjá and up on Búrfell.

External links
 Margrét Traustadóttir : Hallarmælingar í Búrfellsgjá, sumarið 2012. BS ritgerd. Jarðvísindadeild Háskóla Íslands. Leiðbeinandi Sigrún Hreinsdóttir. (2013)  (Text mostly in Icelandic, abstract also in English.)

References

Volcanoes of Iceland
Reykjanes
Reykjanes Volcanic Belt
Krýsuvík Volcanic System